Radio Hill is a hill rising to 50 m, standing  southwest of Mabus Point on the coast of Antarctica. It was discovered and first mapped by the Australasian Antarctic Expedition led by Douglas Mawson, 1911–1914. It was remapped and named by the Soviet expedition of 1956.

Hills of Queen Mary Land